Yan, known in historiography as the Western Yan (384–394) was a dynastic state of China ruled by the Xianbei ethnicity. The dynasty existed during the era of Sixteen Kingdoms, but it is not counted among the 16. It was founded by Murong Hong in 384 in the aftermath of the Former Qin's defeat by the Eastern Jin in the Battle of Fei River, with the stated intent of permitting the Xianbei, whom the Former Qin's emperor Fu Jiān had relocated to Former Qin's capital region after destroying the Former Yan in 370. It initially also was intended to rescue the last Former Yan emperor Murong Wei, until he was executed by Fu Jiān in 385. It was a state that was characterized by extreme political instability and internal fighting, as all seven of its rulers (during a short span of 10 years) died of unnatural causes. After eviscerating the Former Qin, the people of the state abandoned the Guanzhong region and headed east back toward their homeland, but eventually settled down in modern Shanxi. It was destroyed in 394 as Later Yan's emperor Murong Chui wanted to reunite the people formerly of Yan and conquered it.

Some rulers of the Western Yan declared themselves emperors while some declared themselves wang (translatable as either "king" or "prince").

Rulers of the Western Yan

See also
Xianbei
List of past Chinese ethnic groups
Wu Hu

References 

 
394 disestablishments
384 establishments
Dynasties in Chinese history
Former countries in Chinese history